Catalanotoxotus is a genus of beetles in the family Cerambycidae, containing the following species:

 Catalanotoxotus nivosus Vives, 2005
 Catalanotoxotus pauliani (Vives, 2004)

References

Dorcasominae